LTWA is an abbreviation for one of the following:

 List of Title Word Abbreviations, the complete list of ISO 4 standard abbreviations
 Little Tennessee Watershed Association
 Library of Tibetan Works and Archives